is a Japanese wrestler and Olympic champion in Freestyle wrestling. He also won a gold medal at the 1967 World Wrestling Championships and at the 1966 Asian Games.

Olympics
Nakata competed at the 1968 Summer Olympics in Mexico City where he received a gold medal in Freestyle wrestling, the flyweight class.

References

1945 births
Living people
Olympic wrestlers of Japan
Wrestlers at the 1968 Summer Olympics
Japanese male sport wrestlers
Olympic gold medalists for Japan
People from Asahikawa
Olympic medalists in wrestling
Asian Games medalists in wrestling
Wrestlers at the 1966 Asian Games
Medalists at the 1968 Summer Olympics
Asian Games gold medalists for Japan
Medalists at the 1966 Asian Games
World Wrestling Champions
World Wrestling Championships medalists
20th-century Japanese people
21st-century Japanese people